The Options Price Reporting Authority (OPRA) provides, through market data vendors, last sale information and current options quotations from a committee of participant exchanges designated as the Options Price Reporting Authority.

OPRA is a national market system plan that governs the process by which options market data are collected from participant exchanges, consolidated, and disseminated.

Participant Exchanges

Current OPRA participants include:

 NYSE Amex Equities (AMEX)
 Boston Options Exchange (BOX)
 Chicago Board Options Exchange (CBOE)
 Miami International Holdings (EMERALD)
 Nasdaq, Inc.(GEMX)
 Nasdaq, Inc.(ISE)
 Nasdaq, Inc.(MRX)
 Miami International Holdings (MIAX)
 NYSE (ARCA)
 Miami International Holdings  (PEARL)
 Nasdaq, Inc.(NASD)
 Nasdaq, Inc.(BX)
 Chicago Board Options Exchange (C2)
 Nasdaq Philadelphia Stock Exchange (PHLX)
 Chicago Board Options Exchange (BATS)

Acquisition and Distribution of Market Data

The Securities Industry Automation Corporation (SIAC) gathers the last sale and quote information from each of the participant exchanges. SIAC then consolidates and disseminates that data to approved vendors.

Available Data

The OPRA data feed provides:

 Trades: last sale reports for completed securities transactions
 Quotes: bids and offers for options

Technology Infrastructure

SIAC is responsible for the OPRA systems and networks. CBOE serves as the OPRA administrator.

Messages per Second

A significant gauge of the level of options market data is messages per second (MPS). Messages per second is just that - the number of messages (i.e., options trade and quote data) reported to OPRA by the options exchanges during any given second of a trading day.

Data volume has increased dramatically since the early 1990s, as illustrated in the following table.

Commentators suggest that there are three underlying causes of the increase:

 Penny Pricing: In early February 2007, the options industry started switching its minimum price increment from $0.05 (nickels) to $0.01 (pennies). Because options prices are automatically updated as soon as the underlying stock price changes, the potential existed to update at five times as many price points.
 Dollar Strikes: The standard stock option strike prices are in increments of $2.50 at and below $25, and in $5.00 increments for strikes above $25. A Dollar Strike Program would potentially increase the number of available options contracts by five times.
 Reg NMS

The OPRA MPS data rates are more than 60 times those seen in the equities market, and options data represents well over 75% of all market data.

See also
 Ticker tape
 Market data

References

Financial markets
Finance in the United States